El Badra is an Algerian television series, produced and broadcast by Télévision Algérienne, directed by Mohamed Hazourli. It premiere from 2008 to 2010 on Télévision Algérienne, A3 and Canal Algérie.

It stars Mohammed Adjaimi, Fatiha Berber, Nidhal Doja and Asma Djermoune in the main role.

Series overview

References 

Algerian television series
Arabic television series
2008 Algerian television series debuts
2010s Algerian television series
Public Establishment of Television original programming